Microdochium bolleyi is a fungal plant pathogen that causes root rot in flax and wheat.

References

External links 
 Index Fungorum
 USDA ARS Fungal Database

Fungal plant pathogens and diseases
Wheat diseases
Xylariales